Cosmosoma stryma is a moth of the subfamily Arctiinae. It was described by Herbert Druce in 1884. It is found in Mexico and Nicaragua.

References

stryma
Moths described in 1884